Gymnopilus levis is a species of mushroom in the family Hymenogastraceae.

See also

List of Gymnopilus species

External links
Gymnopilus levis at Index Fungorum

levis
Fungi of North America